Lay It All on Me may refer to:
Lay It All on Me (album), a 2013 album by James Christian
"Lay It All on Me" (song), a 2015 single by Rudimental featuring Ed Sheeran
"Lay It All on Me", song by Big & Rich from Hillbilly Jedi
"Lay It All on Me", song by Blackberry Smoke from Holding All the Roses
"Lay It All on Me", song by the Black Crowes from Lions
"Lay It All on Me", song by the Swon Brothers from Set List
"Lay It All on Me", 2010 song by Willie Mack

See also
Lay It on Me